Shihara is a Union Parishad of Patnitala Upazila in Naogaon District in the Division of Rajshahi, Bangladesh.

Economy
Most of the people of this union depend on agriculture. Previously paddy was the main crop of this area. But the farmers faced financial loss in paddy cultivation so they started cultivating mango.
Mango is currently the main crop in the region. Many types of mango like Amrapali, Bari-4, Langra, Fazli, Ashwina, Khirsapati etc. are cultivated in about 80% of the land. Farmers are now benefited by cultivating mango.

See also
 Patnitala Upazila
 Naogaon District
 Agradigun Union
 Unions of Bangladesh

References

Unions of Patnitala Upazila